Route 0, or Highway 0, may refer to routes in the following countries:

Belgium
  R0 motorway (Belgium), the ring road around Brussels

Czech Republic
  D0 motorway (Czech Republic), bypassing Prague.

Hungary
  M0 motorway (Hungary), bypassing Budapest

Numbered streets
0 Avenue in BC, Canada

Future highways
  Bucharest Ring Motorway, in Romania, when constructed, will be numbered A0.

Fictional
 Highway 0 from Jet Set Radio Future
 Interstate 0 from I-0
 Route 0 from Kentucky Route Zero

See also
 U.S. Route 2, the highway carrying the designation assigned to avoid a U.S. Route 0